The John Hutcherson House, in Garrard County, Kentucky near Buckeye, is a historic stone house built around 1800.  It was listed on the National Register of Historic Places in 1983.

It is a one-and-a-half-story five bay dry stone house with a central passage plan layout.

References

Houses on the National Register of Historic Places in Kentucky
Federal architecture in Kentucky
Houses completed in 1800
Houses in Garrard County, Kentucky
National Register of Historic Places in Garrard County, Kentucky
1800 establishments in Kentucky
Central-passage houses